Sickle Moon may refer to:
The crescent shape or lunar phase
Sickle Moon Peak